Aramis Knight (born October 3, 1999) is an American film and television actor. He played Bean in the 2013 film adaptation of Ender's Game and M.K. in the AMC series Into the Badlands (2015–2019).

Early life
Knight was born on October 3, 1999 in Los Angeles, California and grew up in Woodland Hills. His father is of Pakistani descent, while his mother Rhonda Knight is of English, Irish and German descent.

Career
In 2005, Knight began acting in commercials and playing minor screen roles. Since then, he has guest-starred and played recurring characters on various television shows, including Scorpion, The Middle, Psych, NCIS, Lost, Dexter, and Boston Legal. His film roles have included Crossing Over and Rendition.

Knight has also done voice acting for multiple projects, including Shrek Forever After and Happy Feet Two.

Knight portrayed Bean, the best friend of main character Ender Wiggin, in the science fiction/fantasy film Ender's Game (2013).

From 2015 to 2019, Knight played the lead role of M.K., "a boy with unexplained magic powers", on Into the Badlands. Into the Badlands is an AMC television series described as "a high-octane sci-fi martial arts series" and as a "post-apocalyptic drama". Knight, along with other cast members, received several weeks of martial arts training for their roles.

Filmography

Film

Television

References

External links 
 
 
 
 

1999 births
21st-century American male actors
Male actors from Los Angeles
American male child actors
Living people
American people of English descent
American people of German descent
American people of Indian descent
American people of Irish descent
American people of Pakistani descent